Hefner: Unauthorized is a 1999 television film about Hugh Hefner.

Premise
The unauthorized biography of Hugh Hefner and the birth of the Playboy empire.

Cast
 Randall Batinkoff as Hugh Hefner
 Natasha Gregson Wagner as Bobbie Arnstein
 Rebecca Herbst as Barbi Benton
 Rebecca Romijn as Kimberly Hefner
 Mark Harelik as Mike Wallace
 Gail Cronauer as Grace Hefner

References

External links
 

1999 television films
1999 films
American television films
Films directed by Peter Werner